Sameer Khakhar (9 August 1952 – 15 March 2023) was an Indian film and television actor in Bollywood. Some of Sameer Khakhar's notable work was in TV shows "Nukkad", " Circus" and "Shrimaan Shrimati", and films such as "Pushpak", "Parinda" and "Jai Ho".

Life and career
Khakhar's notable TV serial roles include the one of the drunken character Khopdi from yesteryears milestone TV serial Nukkad in 1986, directed by Kundan Shah and Saeed Akhtar Mirza. His most memorable film role was in the dialogue-free Pushpaka Vimana (1987) of the alcoholic businessman who gets kidnapped by the hero – Kamal Haasan.

Khakhar died from multiple organ failure on 15 March 2023, at the age of 71.

Filmography

Films

 1985 Chhun Chhun Karti Aayee Chidiya (Video)
 1987 Jawab Hum Denge – Kulkarni
 1987 Pushpak – Rich man (as Samir Khakhar)
 1988 Mere Baad 
 1988 Mera Shikar
 1988 Shahenshah
 1989 Guru - Sameer
 1989 Nafrat Ki Aandhi
 1989 Parinda – Iqbal
 1989 Rakhwaala – Drunk
 1989 Shehzaade – Suraj's friend
 1989 Vardi – Havaldar
 1989 Jurrat – Makkhan Singh
 1990 Awwal Number – Rao – Terrorist
 1991 Baarish
 1992 Pyar Deewana Hota Hain
 1993 Dhartiputra – Orphanage Manager
 1993 Hum Hain Kamaal Ke – Constable Panna (as Sameer Kakad)
 1993 Kirdaar (TV Series) – Dhelisa Singh – Mukhbir
 1993 Tahqiqaat – Salim
 1994 Dilbar – Drunk (as Sameer Khakad)
 1994 Dilwale – Orderly (as Samir Khakhar)
 1994 Eena Meena Deeka – Eena's Neighbour (uncredited)
 1994 Insaaf Apne Lahoo Se – Rani's Father (as Sameer Khakkad)
 1994 Prem Shakti – Kewalchand
 1994 Raja Babu – Amavas
 1995 Aatank Hi Aatank (as Samir Khakkar)
 1995 Police Lockup – Havaldar
 1995 Takkar (as Sameer Khakkar)
 1995 Teen Chor (Short) 
 1996 Return of Jewel Thief – Cameraman (as Sameer Khakkar)
 1997 Agni Morcha
 1998 Chal Aati Hai Kya Khandala (TV Movie) 
 1998 Khote Sikkey (as Sameer Khakar)
 2014 Hasee Toh Phasee – Alpesh Bhai
 2014 Jai Ho – Drunken Man
 2017 Patel Ki Punjabi Shaadi 
 2017 Wassup! Zindagi – Rehaan's Father
 2018 Patakha (vaidhya)
 2023 ''Farzi Webseries

Television

Web series

Short films

References

External links
 

1952 births
2023 deaths 
Deaths from multiple organ failure
Male actors from Mumbai
Indian male film actors
Male actors in Hindi cinema
Male actors in Kannada cinema
20th-century Indian male actors
21st-century Indian male actors
Male actors in Hindi television